Satya Sai is a residential locality within the largest city and commercial hub Indore, Madhya Pradesh, India. Here also many developers and real estate prices have shot up and are comparable to any posh areas of Indore, in large part because of the continued boom of immigrants.
The area is named after the popular school Shri Satya Sai Vidya Vihar which is among the prominent English schools of Indore.

Postal Code: 452003

Outlook

Satya Sai is known for its popular Sathya Sai School as well as the Ashram run by the school ashram samiti.
It is a link for the prominent 20,000 bedded Bombay Hospital, the only NABH accredited hospital of the city.

Society Flats in Satya Sai
A lot of society are blooming up here along with hotels and motels. The housing society include :
BCM Heights
RCM
Utkarsh
Swarga Parisar
Nirmal Udyan etc.

Transportation

Road

Bus Routes

There are most preferable city buses, which connects the area with other localities :

The Dewas - Pithampur Bus Service by-pass whole Indore, connects Satya Sai. Besides this, many city vans, metro taxi, star cab,  service connects it to other localities of Indore.

References

Suburbs of Indore
Neighbourhoods in Indore